These are the long track speed skating at the 2007 Canada Games events for the 2007 Canada Winter Games in Whitehorse, Yukon. For the short track events see short track speed skating at the 2007 Canada Winter Games.

100 metres

500 metres

1000 metres

1500 metres

3000 metres

5000 metres

Team Pursuit 

2007 Canada Winter Games
Canada 2007
2007 in speed skating